Brendan Norman Brady (3 February 1917 – 17 January 2010) was an Australian rules footballer who played with Hawthorn in the Victorian Football League (VFL).

Brady was an follower from Doncaster who was recruited before the start of the 1940 season. Brady managed eight senior games over two seasons with the "Mayblooms". He enlisted in the army to fight at the end of the 1940 season and couldn't get time off to continue with his football.

Notes

External links 

1917 births
2010 deaths
Australian rules footballers from Victoria (Australia)
Hawthorn Football Club players
Australian Army personnel of World War II
Australian Army soldiers
People from Shepparton